Viscount Melville, of Melville in the County of Edinburgh, is a title in the Peerage of the United Kingdom.

Origins

The title was created on 24 December 1802 for the notable lawyer and politician Henry Dundas. He was created Baron Dunira, of Dunira in the County of Perth, at the same time, also in the Peerage of the United Kingdom. Dundas, who was the fourth son of Robert Dundas, of Arniston, the elder, declined an earldom in 1809.

He was succeeded by his son, the second Viscount, who was also a noted politician. He assumed for himself the additional surname of Saunders, which was that of his father-in-law. His son, the third Viscount, was a General in the British Army. The latter was succeeded by his younger brother, the fourth Viscount, who in his turn was succeeded by his nephew, the fifth Viscount, the eldest son of Reverend the Honourable Charles Dundas, Rector of Epworth, Lincolnshire, fourth son of the second Viscount. The fifth Viscount was succeeded by his younger brother, the sixth Viscount, a minor diplomat. The titles descended from father to son until the death of the sixth Viscount's grandson, the eighth Viscount, in 1971. The latter was succeeded by his nephew, the ninth Viscount, the eldest son of the Honourable Robert Maldred St John Melville Dundas, second son of the seventh Viscount.  the titles are held by the ninth Viscount's eldest son, the tenth Viscount, who succeeded in 2011.

The family seat is Melville Castle between Dalkeith and Lasswade. The first five viscounts (including Henry Dundas) are buried in a simple vault (gated but unlocked) in Old Lasswade Kirkyard. The 6th Viscount Melville, Charles Saunders Dundas, lies opposite his wife, Mary Hamilton Dundas, in the small north cemetery in Lasswade, adjacent to the old kirkyard. Their son, the 7th Viscount merely appears as a footnote on the monument.

Viscounts Melville (1802)

Henry Dundas, 1st Viscount Melville (1742–1811)
Robert Saunders–Dundas, 2nd Viscount Melville (1771–1851) and son of 1st Viscount
Henry Dundas, 3rd Viscount Melville (1801–1876) son of 2nd Viscount
Robert Dundas, 4th Viscount Melville (1803–1886) son of 2nd Viscount and brother of the 3rd
Robert Dundas, 5th Viscount Melville (1835–1904) nephew of 2nd Viscount
Charles Saunders Dundas, 6th Viscount Melville (1843–1926) brother of 5th Viscount
Henry Charles Clement Dundas, 7th Viscount Melville (1873–1935) son of 6th Viscount
Henry Charles Patric Brouncker Dundas, 8th Viscount Melville (1909–1971) and son of 7th Viscount
Robert David Ross Dundas, 9th Viscount Melville (1937–2011) and nephew of 8th Viscount
Robert Henry Kirkpatrick Dundas, 10th Viscount Melville (b. 1984) and son of 9th Viscount 

The heir apparent is the present holder's son Hon. Max David Henry Dundas (b. 2018)

See also
 Dunira, Perthshire

References

References 
Kidd, Charles, Williamson, David (editors). Debrett's Peerage and Baronetage (1990 edition). New York: St Martin's Press, 1990,

External links

Viscountcies in the Peerage of the United Kingdom
Noble titles created in 1802
Noble titles created for UK MPs
Dundas family